The Paradine Case is a 1947 American film noir courtroom drama film, set in England, directed by Alfred Hitchcock and produced by David O. Selznick. The screenplay was written by Selznick and an uncredited Ben Hecht, from an adaptation by Alma Reville and James Bridie of the 1933 novel of the same title by Robert Smythe Hichens. The film stars Gregory Peck, Ann Todd, Alida Valli, Charles Laughton, Charles Coburn, Ethel Barrymore, and Louis Jourdan. It tells of an English barrister who falls in love with a woman who is accused of murder, and how it affects his relationship with his wife.

Plot
In London, Maddalena Anna Paradine (Alida Valli) is a very beautiful and enigmatic young Italian woman who is accused of poisoning her older, blind husband, a wealthy retired colonel. It is not clear whether she is a grateful and devoted wife who has been falsely charged or a calculating and ruthless femme fatale.

Mrs. Paradine's solicitor, Sir Simon Flaquer (Charles Coburn), hires Anthony Keane (Gregory Peck), a brilliant and successful barrister, to defend her in court. Although Keane has been happily married for 11 years, he instantly becomes deeply infatuated with this exotic, mysterious, and fascinating client. Keane's kind-hearted wife, Gay (Ann Todd), sees his obsession, and although he offers to relinquish the case, presses him to continue. She knows that a "guilty" verdict, followed by Mrs. Paradine's hanging, will mean that she will lose her husband emotionally forever. The only way that she can regain her husband's love and devotion is if he is able to obtain a "not guilty" verdict for Mrs. Paradine.

Meanwhile, Keane himself starts to focus his legal efforts on Colonel Paradine's mysterious servant, André Latour (Louis Jourdan). Consciously or subconsciously, Keane sees Latour as a suitable scapegoat on whom he can pin the crime of murder, but this strategy backfires. After Keane has pressured Latour in court, triggering an angry outburst, word comes that Latour has killed himself. Mrs. Paradine is coldly furious that Keane has destroyed Latour, who was, in fact, her lover. On the witness stand, she tells Keane that she hates him and that he has murdered the only person she loved. She goes so far as to say that she poisoned her husband in order to be with Latour.

Keane is overwhelmed, physically, intellectually, and emotionally. Attempting to summarize, he improvises a brief and faltering speech, admitting how poorly he has handled the case, but cannot continue speaking, and has to leave the court. He stays overnight at Sir Simon's office, feeling that his career is in ruins. His wife finds him there; she offers reconciliation, and hope for the future.

Cast

Cast notes
 Hitchcock originally wanted Greta Garbo to play Mrs. Maddalena Anna Paradine, but she turned down the role after the screen test, which allowed Alida Valli to step in for her American film debut. The Paradine Case was also the American film debut of Louis Jourdan. Both Valli and Jourdan hoped that the film would give them the status in the U.S. that they enjoyed in their home countries (Italy and France, respectively), but that did not happen, though Jourdan later made many U.S. films.

Production
David O. Selznick had purchased the rights to Robert Smythe Hichens' novel in 1933, before it was published, when Selznick was still at MGM, with Greta Garbo in mind to star – indeed, Garbo was Hichens' inspiration for the creation of Mrs. Paradine. Garbo did consider doing the film, but ultimately turned it down, as she decided to retire from acting. (Garbo had also turned down I Remember Mama at about the same time, and is reputed to have said "No murderesses, no mamas".)

Howard Estabrook was assigned to write the script at that time, and it was announced that John Barrymore, Lionel Barrymore and Diana Wynyard would star in the film. A draft of the script was submitted by MGM to the censors at the Hays Office, who warned that the script would likely be rejected since Mrs. Paradine was guilty of murder, adultery and perjury, and later committed suicide. They also objected to the judge being portrayed as a sadist who enjoyed sending people to their deaths. A new draft of the script was submitted, but not for some years, in 1942, and this script was approved. In 1946, another version was sent in, and this was also approved after the suicide was removed from the story.

In 1946, it was announced that Alfred Hitchcock would direct the film, and that Laurence Olivier would star as the barrister, but Olivier eventually turned the project down, as he was preparing for his production of Hamlet. Hitchcock was interested in Ronald Colman for the part as well as Garbo (who had not yet turned down the project) or Ingrid Bergman for Mrs. Paradine. Other actors who were considered for the film include: Maurice Evans, Joseph Cotten, Alan Marshal, James Mason for Anthony Keane; Hedy Lamarr for Mrs. Paradine; Claude Rains for Lord Thomas Horfield; and Robert Newton for Mrs. Paradine's lover. In the end, Hitchcock pushed for Gregory Peck, then at the peak of his box-office appeal, Ann Todd was loaned from the Rank Organisation to play his wife, and Selznick settled on Alida Valli, considered one of the more promising actresses in the Italian cinema for Mrs. Paradine.

The Paradine Case was the last film made under Hitchcock's seven-year contract with Selznick, and it has been suggested that Hitchcock was tired of the association by that time. In an interview with François Truffaut, Hitchcock said that he and his wife Alma Reville wrote the first draft of the script together, before bringing in Scottish playwright James Bridie to do a polishing – but Selznick was dissatisfied with the result, and would view the previous day's rushes, do a rewrite, and send the new scenes to the set to be shot.  According to his biographer Donald Spoto "...Hitchcock's disgust with the content and method that were forced upon him conspired to produce an uneasy atmosphere from which Hitchcock could scarcely wait to extricate himself."  Gregory Peck said of the director, "He seemed really bored with the whole thing..."

The film was in production from December 19, 1946, to May 7, 1947, with retakes done in November of that year. Although some external shots show the Lake District in Cumbria, the rest of the footage was shot entirely on three sets at Selznick's Culver City, California, lot, a first in Selznick's career as an independent producer. Selznick reportedly spared no expense: the set for the courtroom scenes exactly duplicated a courtroom in London's Old Bailey, photographed, with permission, by unit manager Fred Ahern, and built in 85 days at the cost of $80,000. Unusually, the set had ceilings to allow for low camera angles.

For the courtroom sequence, Hitchcock used a new technique by using four cameras shooting simultaneously, each focused on one of the principal actors in the scene – multiple camera photography had been used in the past, but only to shoot the same subject. This set-up, including elaborately choreographed crane shots, allowed Hitchcock to shoot long 10-minute takes, something he would push to the limit on his next two films, Rope (1948) and Under Capricorn (1949).

The completed film cost an estimated $4,258,000 to make, almost as expensive as Gone with the Wind. Selznick maintained close supervision on the production, and interfered with Hitchcock's normally carefully budgeted process by insisting on extensive re-takes. When Hitchcock insisted on receiving his contractual $1000/day fee, Selznick took over post-production, supervising the editing and the scoring of the film. The producer went through eighteen different title changes for the picture before rechristening it The Paradine Case, just hours before the premiere.

The Paradine Case had its world premiere in Los Angeles on December 29, 1947, opening simultaneously in two theaters across the street from each other in Westwood, California. It then had its New York City premiere on January 8, 1948. On its initial release, the film was 132 minutes long, due to Selznick's editing of Hitchcock's rough cut, which ran almost three hours. After the film's premieres, Selznick pulled the film from distribution and re-cut it for general release, bringing it down to 114 minutes, which is currently the length of the film on DVD release. In 1980, a flood reportedly destroyed the uncut original version of the film, making a restoration of that version unlikely.

The Paradine Case was not a box office success: worldwide receipts barely covered half of the cost of production.

Almost every Hitchcock film has a cameo appearance by Alfred Hitchcock. In this film, he can be seen leaving the Cumberland train station, carrying a cello, at about 38 minutes into the film.

Hitchcock described The Paradine Case as "...a love story embedded in the emotional quicksand of a murder trial".

Production credits
The production credits on the film were as follows:
 Director - Alfred Hitchcock
 Producer - David O. Selznick
 Writing - David O. Selznick (screenplay), Alma Reville (adaptation)
 Cinematography - Lee Garmes (director of photography)
 Music - Franz Waxman 
 Art direction - Joseph McMillan Johnson (production design), Thomas N. Morahan (art director), Joseph B. Platt (interiors), Emile Kuri (set decoration)
 Costumes - Travis Banton (gowns)
 Editor - Hal C. Kern (supervising film editor)
 Sound - James G. Stewart (sound director), Richard Van Hessen (recorder)
 Assistant director - Lowell J. Farrell
 Unit manager - Fred Ahern
 Special effects - Clarence Slifer
 Hair styles - Larry Germain

Critical reception
Bosley Crowther, film critic for The New York Times, liked the film, the acting, and Hitchcock's direction, and wrote, "With all the skill in presentation for which both gentlemen are famed, David O. Selznick and Alfred Hitchcock have put upon the screen a slick piece of static entertainment in their garrulous The Paradine Case... Gregory Peck is impressively impassioned as the famous young London barrister who lets his heart, cruelly captured by his client, rule his head. And Ann Todd, the pliant British actress, is attractively anguished as his wife. Alida Valli, an import from Italy, makes the caged Mrs. Paradine a compound of mystery, fascination and voluptuousness with a pair of bedroom eyes, and Louis Jourdan, a new boy from Paris, is electric as the badgered valet."

Variety wrote, "high dramatics...Hitchcock's penchant for suspense and unusual atmosphere development get full play. There is a deliberateness of pace, artful pauses and other carefully calculated melodramatic hinges upon which he swings the story and players. Time Out says "Bleak in its message (those who love passionately inevitably destroy the object of their desire), the movie only half works. The intricate, triangular plot is finally overburdened by the courtroom setting."

Leonard Maltin said "talk, talk, talk in complicated, stagy courtroom drama;"

Despite the mixed reviews the movie received, most critics noted the strong performances of Ann Todd and Joan Tetzel.

Awards and honors
Ethel Barrymore was nominated for a 1947 Oscar for Best Supporting Actress as Lady Sophie Horfield.

Adaptation
Lux Radio Theatre broadcast a radio adaptation of the film on 9 May 1949, starring Joseph Cotten, with Alida Valli and Louis Jourdan reprising their roles.

References

Sources
 The Paradine Case, Hichens Robert, Ernest Benn (1947), ASIN B00178VIDM
 The Complete Films of Alfred Hitchcock, Michael S. Lasky and Robert A. Harris, Citadel Press,

External links 

The Paradine Case at Louisjourdan.net (archived)
In and Around The Paradine Case by Douglas Pye
The Paradine Case on Lux Radio Theater: May 9, 1949

1947 films
1947 drama films
American legal drama films
American black-and-white films
1940s English-language films
American courtroom films
Film noir
Films based on mystery novels
Films based on British novels
Films set in country houses
Films set in Cumbria
Films set in London
Films set in 1946
Films shot in Cumbria
Selznick International Pictures films
Films produced by David O. Selznick
Films directed by Alfred Hitchcock
Films with screenplays by Ben Hecht
Films scored by Franz Waxman
Films scored by Paul Dessau
1940s American films